Boban Ranković (born 4 February 1979) is a Serbian rower. He competed in the men's coxless four event at the 2000 Summer Olympics.

References

External links
 

1979 births
Living people
Serbian male rowers
Olympic rowers of Serbia and Montenegro
Rowers at the 2000 Summer Olympics
Place of birth missing (living people)